Sleeping in the Nothing is the second and most recent studio album by Kelly Osbourne, released in 2005. Unlike the pop punk sound of her first album, Sleeping in the Nothing features Osbourne singing to '80s-inspired electro beats. For the role of producer, Osbourne worked with Linda Perry.

The Japanese edition of the album contains a cover of the 1986 Stacey Q song "Two of Hearts" as a bonus track.

Not long after the album's release, Osbourne was dropped by her label Sanctuary.

Promotion
Osbourne promoted the album with several appearances on TV shows and award ceremonies, including CD:UK, and the MTV Australia Video Music Awards 2005. Osbourne also made an appearance on Friday Night with Jonathan Ross, during which Ross made comments on Osbourne's weight in regards to the album cover, saying she had been "airbrushed". Osbourne later said of the appearance: "The band that was performing was New Order and they refused to play until he apologised. A lot of it wasn't shown on TV because if they saw what he really said to me, I don't think any parent in the world would ever watch his show again. What he said to me destroyed me for two years." Osbourne also said Ross' comments caused her to "sabotage" her record deal: "I thought, 'What the fuck is the point in me doing this shit when a grown man insults me in this way? I'm not strong enough to do this. I'd rather be the trust-fund kid that everyone thinks I am than work my arse off to get insulted.'" She admitted herself to rehab in June 2005, which stopped any further promotion for the album.

Critical reception

The album received mixed to positive reviews from music critics, many of which began with an admonition to forget about her previous work. Billboard said "the singer sounds incredibly at home in such surroundings." Giving the album three out of five stars, Rolling Stone called it an "occasionally invigorating disc of shiny dance rock". In a C+ review, Entertainment Weekly writer Timothy Gunatilaka wrote: "'Redlight' and 'I Can't Wait' make for fine party starters, and there are fairly groovy beats throughout. But with Sleepings somber subject matter (date rape, rehab) and Osbourne's devitalized delivery, it feels wrong to get down to these ultimately drab songs."

Commercial performance
Sleeping in the Nothing debuted and peaked at number fifty-seven on the UK Albums Chart, lasting one week in the chart. In the United States, the album reached number 117 on the US Billboard 200.

The first and only single from the album, "One Word", peaked at number one on three Billboard dance charts, making Osbourne the first artist in the history of the Billboard charts to top all three dance surveys in the same week. The single also reached number 9 on the UK Singles Chart.

Track listing
All songs written by Linda Perry, except where noted.

"One Word" – 4:01
"Uh Oh" – 3:12
"Redlight" – 3:42
"Secret Lover" (Kelly Osbourne, Linda Perry) – 3:24
"I Can't Wait" – 4:00
"Edge of Your Atmosphere" (Kelly Osbourne, Linda Perry) – 3:45
"Suburbia" (Kelly Osbourne, Linda Perry) – 3:34
"Don't Touch Me While I'm Sleeping" – 3:19
"Save Me" (Kelly Osbourne, Linda Perry) – 3:47
"Entropy" – 3:19
"One Word" (Chris Cox Remix) – 7:55 (hidden track)

Japanese edition bonus track
"Two of Hearts" (John Mitchell, Sue Gatlin, Tim Greene) – 3:56
"One Word" (Chris Cox Remix) – 7:55

Charts

References

2005 albums
Albums produced by Linda Perry
Kelly Osbourne albums
Dance-rock albums